Jayde Pricilla Gail Adams (born 26 November 1984) is a British comedian, actress, writer and opera singer from Bristol. She is the winner of the 2014  Funny Women Award.

Career
Adams started performing stand-up comedy in 2011, following the premature death from an inoperable brain tumour of her sister Jenna, with whom she had danced competitively for 13 years at her aunt's dance school in Bristol. As a child, Adams attended several youth theatre groups in Bristol, including Bristol Old Vic Youth Theatre but never formally trained in acting or singing. She moved to Wales in 2004 to study Drama, Theatre and Media at the University of Glamorgan.

In 2012 she was nominated by Time Out magazine as their wildcard for The Hospital Club 100 Awards list of "Most Influential Person in the Arts".

In 2013 she won the London Cabaret Awards audience vote.

She was the winner of the 2014 Funny Women Award. She hosted the 2020 Funny Women Finals at The Comedy Store in London. Due to the Coronavirus pandemic, the competition was performed with no audience present.

In August 2015 Adams co-hosted the NBC show Before the Morning After, featuring The Pyjama Men, Gina Yashere and Tom Stade. The segment involved Adams finishing the show by singing Offenbach's Barcarolle. In December 2015, she made her TV acting debut in Russell Howard's A Gert Lush Christmas.

In October 2016, Sky Arts released Adams' Halloween comedy short, Bloody Tracy, written by and starring Adams and featuring Spencer Jones and Gabby Best.

In August 2016 Adams wrote and performed in 31, her debut Edinburgh Festival Fringe show, which was nominated for Best Newcomer at the Edinburgh Comedy Awards. She has since been a panellist on Channel 4's comedy quiz shows, 8 Out of 10 Cats and 8 Out of 10 Cats Does Countdown.

In 2017, she hosted Say Whaaat? on Comedy Central with The Tenderloins and Russell Kane. She was also a contestant on Dave's Dara Ó Briain's Go 8 Bit opposite Simon Gregson and host of Comedy Central's Live at the Comedy Store in 2018.

During the 2017 Edinburgh Fringe, Adams' second show Jayded won The Scottish Suns awards for Best Show and Best Female Performer, and was nominated for The Barry Awards for Best Performer. She collaborated with Jerry Springer: The Opera writer Richard Thomas for a song in the show called "No More Mrs Nice Jayde". She transferred this show in December 2017 to London's West End, Soho Theatre with Thomas joining her every night on piano, for the finale.

In 2017, Adams performed stand up on BBC One and appeared on the Red Nose Day broadcast.

She starred as Julia Petley in the 2019 television adaptation of Neil Gaiman's Good Omens.

Adams attended the Edinburgh Festival Fringe in 2018 with her third show The Divine Ms Jayde a homage to Bette Midler's debut album The Divine Miss M.

In 2019 Adams performed "The Ballad of Kylie Jenner’s Old Face" at the Edinburgh Fringe Festival and won JOE's Best Show award. A performance of the show, performed at The Bloomsbury Theatre, was recorded for Amazon Prime Video and released in January 2020 with the title Serious Black Jumper. The show poked fun at modern-day feminism and social media, and involved jokes surrounding the observation that celebrities wear black turtle necks to seem more serious.

In 2020, Adams was long-listed for the 2020 Emmy Awards by The Hollywood Reporter columnist Scott Feinberg for "Best Variety Special (Pre-Recorded)" for her Amazon Prime Stand up Special Serious Black Jumper.

Adams is the host, along with Fred Sirieix from Channel 4's First Dates, of the BAFTA nominated TV show Snackmasters which aired on Channel 4 in 2019. In a cook off at the KitKat factory, Monster Munch Factory and Burger King Factory, two top chefs compete to make the perfect replica, before being judged by the workers and bosses behind the real thing.

In January 2020, she hosted a new food show on Netflix and Channel 4 with Heston Blumenthal called Crazy Delicious, which was long-listed for a TV Choice Award in 2020.

During August 2020, and because of the pandemic, Adams hosted and organised 3 comedy shows with Al Murray at The Clapham Grand for a charity benefit titled Save Live Comedy. The show was named after a hashtag that went viral in July 2020 when The Live Comedy Association found that 77.8% of live comedy venues across the UK are currently fearful of having to shut down within the next year, in the aftermath of the coronavirus pandemic and lockdown measures.

It featured over 50 comedians from the UK comedy scene including; James Acaster, Joe Lycett, Nish Kumar, Aisling Bea, Mawaan Rizwan, Dane Baptiste, Kerry Godliman, Ed Gamble, and Shaparak Khorsandi. Each show was over 3 hours long and broadcast to an audience at home on Zoom. Most performers had not performed on a stage for over 6 months, Shaparak Khorsandi was so emotional she was initially unable to talk. The 3 shows raised over £20,000, which was split between the comedians' favourite comedy venues.

In September 2020, Adams hosted the first episode of BBC Three's Stand Up for Live Comedy filmed in Bristol, with guests Lauren Pattison, Mo Omar and Tom Lucy.

Adams appeared in Richard Osman's House of Games, alongside Scott Mills, Rufus Hound and Josie D'Arby.

In April 2020, Adams appeared in the pilot of Alma's Not Normal before appearing in the full series that was aired between September and October 2021.

In August 2022, Adams was announced to be competing in the twentieth series of Strictly Come Dancing. Her professional partner is Karen Hauer. They were eliminated from the competition in week 5.

In 2023 she filmed her own co-created comedy Ruby Speaking for ITVX, set in a South Bristol call centre, in which she plays the eponymous Ruby.

Personal life 
Born in Bedminster, Bristol, Adams attended her aunt's freestyle disco dancing classes with her sister for 13 years.

She moved to South Wales at the age of 18 and studied drama, theatre and media at The University of Glamorgan.
In Wales, Adams performed experimental theatre and contemporary dance at the Wales Millennium Centre, Cardiff Bay. She currently lives in Leigh-On-Sea. 

In 2015, having performed as an Adele impersonator on the drag scene in London, Adams was asked to join several other Adele impersonators for a show the BBC were doing about impersonators. During the recording Adams walked out, saying “I thought it was going to be this reality show." She missed out on an opportunity to meet Adele during a prank set up by the BBC and Graham Norton for Adele at the BBC  because she didn't trust the producers' motives.

She is a supporter of the LGBT community and works closely with drag performer Jonny Woo. Having started her live performance career at drag bars such as the Royal Vauxhall Tavern, Adams often cites the LGBT community in London as the reason she found confidence after the death of her sister in 2011. 

Adams was in a relationship with fellow comedian Rich Wilson for several years. In 2022, she stated in an interview with Diva magazine that she identifies as pansexual.

In March 2018, alongside Melanie Blatt, Nicole Appleton and Shaznay Lewis from All Saints, Jaime Winstone and British fashion designer Gareth Pugh, Adams was a judge on Miss Sink The Pink 2018, an annual drag queen talent competition held at The Roundhouse in Camden.

Filmography 
 A Gert Lush Christmas (2015) Kelly
 A Spencer Jones Christmas (2015) Shop assistant
 Before The Morning After (2015) host
 Borderline (2016) Celeste Ferguson
 8 Out of 10 Cats (2016) guest
 8 Out of 10 Cats Does Countdown (2016) guest
 Sick Note (2016) Cashier
 Bloody Tracy (2016) Tracy / writer
 Affordable Meats (2017) Herself / writer
 Giddy Up Gunty (2017) Deidre
 Russell Brand's Stand Up Hour for Comic Relief (2017) guest
 Say Whaaat? (2017) host
 The Great Xmas Rant (2017) guest 
 Roast Battle (2018) contestant
 The Chris Ramsey Show (2018) herself 
 Comedy Central's Live At The Comedy Store (2018) host
 Dara Ó Briain's Go 8 Bit (2018) Guest
 Good Omens (2019) Julia Petley
 Amusical (2019) host
 Crazy Delicious (2020) host
 Alma's Not Normal (2020) Leanne
 Strictly Come Dancing (2022) contestant

References

External links

Living people
1984 births
British women comedians
Actresses from Bristol
Alumni of the University of Glamorgan